Marla Glacier is a glacier  long and   wide  on the northeast side of Detroit Plateau on the southern Trinity Peninsula in Graham Land, Antarctica, situated south of Aitkenhead Glacier and north of Diplock Glacier.  It is draining southeastwards along the east slopes of Povien Bluff, then turning east between Mount Roberts and Bezenšek Spur, and flowing into Prince Gustav Channel in Weddell Sea.

The glacier is named after Marla River in Northern Bulgaria.

Location

See also
 List of glaciers in the Antarctic
 Glaciology

Maps
 Antarctic Digital Database (ADD). Scale 1:250000 topographic map of Antarctica. Scientific Committee on Antarctic Research (SCAR). Since 1993, regularly upgraded and updated.

References
 Marla Glacier SCAR Composite Antarctic Gazetteer
 Bulgarian Antarctic Gazetteer Antarctic Place-names Commission in Bulgarian
 Bulgarian Antarctic Gazetteer. Antarctic Place-names Commission. (details in Bulgarian, basic data in English)

External links
 Marla Glacier. Copernix satellite image

Glaciers of Trinity Peninsula
Bulgaria and the Antarctic